The men's horizontal bar competition was one of eight events for male competitors in artistic gymnastics at the 1976 Summer Olympics in Montreal. The qualification and final rounds took place on July 18, 20, and 23rd at the Montreal Forum. There were 90 competitors from 20 nations, with nations competing in the team event having 6 gymnasts while other nations could have up to 3 gymnasts. The event was won by Mitsuo Tsukahara of Japan, the second man to successfully defend an Olympic title in the horizontal bar. It was the third consecutive victory by a Japanese gymnast in the event, and fifth in six Games. Japan also took silver, as Eizo Kenmotsu finished second, but was prevented from repeating its 1972 podium sweep by new rules that limited nations to two gymnasts in the final (Japan had the top four gymnasts in qualifying). Tsukuhara and Kenmotsu (bronze in 1968) were the seventh and eighth men to win multiple medals in the horizontal bar. Henri Boerio of France and Eberhard Gienger of West Germany tied for bronze, the first medal for France in the event since 1924 and first horizontal bar medal for West Germany.

Background

This was the 14th appearance of the event, which is one of the five apparatus events held every time there were apparatus events at the Summer Olympics (no apparatus events were held in 1900, 1908, 1912, or 1920). Four of the six finalists from 1972 returned: gold medalist Mitsuo Tsukahara, silver medalist Sawao Kato, and fourth-place finisher (and 1968 bronze medalist) Eizo Kenmotsu of Japan and sixth-place finisher Nikolai Andrianov of the Soviet Union. Eberhard Gienger of West Germany was the reigning (1974) world champion.

Israel made its debut in the men's horizontal bar. The United States made its 13th appearance, most of any nation, having missed only the inaugural 1896 Games.

Competition format

Each nation entered a team of six gymnasts or up to three individual gymnasts. All entrants in the gymnastics competitions performed both a compulsory exercise and a voluntary exercise for each apparatus. The scores for all 12 exercises were summed to give an individual all-around score. These exercise scores were also used for qualification for the apparatus finals. The two exercises (compulsory and voluntary) for each apparatus were summed to give an apparatus score. The top 6 in each apparatus participated in the finals, except that nations were limited to two finalists each; others were ranked 7th through 90th. Half of the preliminary score carried over to the final.

Schedule

All times are Eastern Daylight Time (UTC-4)

Results

Ninety gymnasts competed in the compulsory and optional rounds on July 18 and 20. The six highest scoring gymnasts advanced to the final on July 23. Each country was limited to two competitors in the final. Half of the points earned by each gymnast during both the compulsory and optional rounds carried over to the final. This constitutes the "prelim" score.

References

Official Olympic Report
www.gymnasticsresults.com
www.gymn-forum.net

Men's horizontal bar
Men's 1976
Men's events at the 1976 Summer Olympics